The Women's 48 kg event at the 2010 South American Games was held on March 20.

Medalists

Results

Main Bracket

Repechage

References

 Report

W48
South American Games 2010
South American Games W48